German submarine U-411 was a Type VIIC U-boat built for Nazi Germany's Kriegsmarine for service during World War II.
She was laid down on 28 January 1941 by Danziger Werft, Danzig as yard number 112, launched on 15 November 1941 and commissioned on 18 March 1942 under Oberleutnant zur See Gerhard Litterscheid.

Design
German Type VIIC submarines were preceded by the shorter Type VIIB submarines. U-411 had a displacement of  when at the surface and  while submerged. She had two shafts and two  propellers.

U-411 was fitted with five  torpedo tubes (four fitted at the bow and one at the stern), fourteen torpedoes, one  SK C/35 naval gun, 220 rounds, and a  C/30 anti-aircraft gun. The boat had a complement of between forty-four and sixty.

Service history
The boat's career began with training at 8th U-boat Flotilla on 18 March 1942, followed by active service on 1 September 1942 as part of the 6th Flotilla for the remainder of her service.

In two patrols she sank no ships.

Wolfpacks
U-411 took part in three wolfpacks, namely:
 Vorwärts (25 August – 18 September 1942)
 Westwall (8 – 9 November 1942)
 Schlagetot (9 – 13 November 1942)

Fate
U-411 was sunk on 13 November 1942 in the North Atlantic, west of Gibraltar, in position , by depth charges from a RAF Hudson bomber. All hands were lost.

References

Bibliography

External links

German Type VIIC submarines
1941 ships
U-boats commissioned in 1942
Ships lost with all hands
U-boats sunk in 1942
U-boats sunk by depth charges
U-boats sunk by British aircraft
World War II shipwrecks in the Atlantic Ocean
World War II submarines of Germany
Ships built in Danzig
Maritime incidents in November 1942